César Zabala Fernández (3 June 1961 – 31 January 2020) was a Paraguayan football (soccer) defender. He played professional football in Paraguay for Cerro Porteño, and had short spells in Argentina with Talleres de Córdoba and in Brazil with Sport Club Internacional.

Career
Zabala was born in Luque, Paraguay, and played professionally for Sportivo Luqueño and Cerro Porteño.

International 
Zabala made his international debut for the Paraguay national football team on 3 February 1985 in a friendly match against Uruguay (1-0 loss) in Montevideo. A participant at the 1986 FIFA World Cup in Mexico, Zabala held 49 international caps and scored three goals for the national side.

References

1961 births
2020 deaths
Paraguayan footballers
Paraguay international footballers
Association football central defenders
Talleres de Córdoba footballers
Sport Club Internacional players
Cerro Porteño players
1986 FIFA World Cup players
1987 Copa América players
1989 Copa América players
1991 Copa América players
Paraguayan expatriate footballers
Expatriate footballers in Argentina
Paraguayan expatriate sportspeople in Argentina
Expatriate footballers in Brazil
Paraguayan expatriate sportspeople in Brazil
Sportspeople from Luque
Deaths from bladder cancer
Deaths from cancer in Paraguay
Sportivo Luqueño players